Oliver Edward "Bo" Scaife, III (born January 6, 1981) is a former American football tight end. He was originally drafted by the Tennessee Titans in the sixth round of the 2005 NFL Draft. He played college football at Texas.

Early years
Scaife attended Mullen High School in Denver, Colorado with fellow NFL tight end Alex Smith and J.D. Chism. He earned Parade All-American, Gatorade Circle of Champions Colorado Player of the Year, Rocky Mountain News Colorado Offensive Player of the Year and second-team All-USA honors at tight end by USA Today as a senior. Also two-time first-team Colorado 5A All-State selection by Denver Post. Scaife led his team to Colorado 5A state title as a senior, while catching 62 passes for 1,400 yards and 19 touchdowns and rushing for 250 yards on 20 carries and one touchdown.

College career
He played college football at the University of Texas from 1999 to 2004, and was a sixth year senior after missing both the 2000 and 2002 seasons due to ACL injuries. As a sophomore, he was an All-Big 12 honorable mention, and in his last year, he won first-team All-Big 12 Selection. Scaife finished his career with 75 receptions for 997 yards (13.3 yards per rec.), and five touchdowns. He graduated with an education degree in December 2004.

Professional career

Tennessee Titans
Playing for the Titans, Scaife had a productive rookie campaign. Despite being the third-string tight end, he managed to catch 37 passes for 273 yards and 2 touchdowns.

With the Titans selecting Vince Young with the 3rd overall pick in the 2006 NFL Draft, Scaife was reunited with his good friend and former Longhorns teammate. In December 2006, Scaife was sidelined by an ankle injury and rookie tight end Cooper Wallace was signed to provide depth at the position.

In 2007 Bo Scaife came in 3rd on the team with 46 catches 421 yards and 1 touchdown.

Bo Scaife is the only tight end in NFL history to rush for a touchdown, catch a touchdown, return a kickoff, and record a tackle in the same season.

On February 28, 2008 the Titans gave Scaife a second-round tender for a one-year deal. He was re-signed on April 2.

Scaife appears with Vince Young as part of Reebok's NFL "Join the Migration" commercial.

On February 19, 2009, the Titans placed their franchise tag on Scaife. On April 27, Scaife signed the franchise tag tender, worth $4.46 million for the 2009 season.

Cincinnati Bengals
After becoming a free agent following the 2010 season, Scaife signed with the Cincinnati Bengals on August 5, 2011.

New England Patriots

On June 7, 2012, Scaife signed with the New England Patriots. He was released on June 18.

Post-career

After retiring from football, he returned to school and graduated with an MBA from George Washington University in the spring of 2014. He then launched FreshEdLife.com, a life performance brand aimed at teaching life lessons, skills, tools and resources from professional athlete and other industry professionals.

References

External links
Tennessee Titans bio

1981 births
Living people
Players of American football from Denver
American football tight ends
Texas Longhorns football players
Tennessee Titans players
Cincinnati Bengals players
New England Patriots players